C. H. Cook Memorial Church was a historic Presbyterian church on Church Street in Sacaton, Arizona.  It was a large, two-story (approximately 6,000 square feet) mission revival building built of adobe and cement.  The addition of the cement allowed for the unusual height for an adobe building.  The church was one of the few two-story adobe buildings in Arizona, and could hold approximately 400 people.  There is a small cemetery in the churchyard which includes the graves of the son and first wife of Dr. Cook, who died in 1884 and 1889 respectively.

The first church began in April 1889.  The C. H. Cook Memorial Church was constructed in 1918 and added to the National Register in 1975.  It was believed to be the oldest Presbyterian church in Arizona. The congregation moved to a new neighboring building in the 1980s.

The vacant church was destroyed in a fire on March 25, 2019.

References

Churches in Arizona
Churches on the National Register of Historic Places in Arizona
Mission Revival architecture in Arizona
Churches completed in 1918
Churches in Pinal County, Arizona
National Register of Historic Places in Pinal County, Arizona
Former National Register of Historic Places in Arizona